The spuccadella is an Italian-American bread roll that has a long, pointed shape. It is used in the preparation of the spuckie sandwich, which is what the Italian sandwich is referred to in East Boston, Massachusetts. The spuckie is still available in some sandwich shops in the Boston area.
The Italian American word "spuccadella" does not exist in the written Italian of Italy, but it may be derived from the common Italian word "spaccatella," a kind of "panino" or bread roll, with rounded ends, that could be used for sandwich making.

See also

 List of bread rolls

References

East Boston
Italian breads
Italian-American cuisine